Pholiurus is a  genus of Eurasian plants in the grass family. The only known species is Pholiurus pannonicus, found in a region stretching from Austria to Kazakhstan.

formerly included
see Henrardia, Parapholis and Phacelurus.
 Pholiurus filiformis – Parapholis filiformis 
 Pholiurus glabriglumis – Henrardia persica 
 Pholiurus graecus – Phacelurus digitatus  
 Pholiurus incurvatus – Parapholis incurva 
 Pholiurus persicus – Henrardia persica 
 Pholiurus pubescens – Henrardia pubescens

References 

Pooideae
Monotypic Poaceae genera
Flora of Europe
Flora of Asia